The Ontario Apartments are an historic apartment complex located at 25-31 and 37-41 Ontario Street in Providence, Rhode Island.  The apartments were designed by Page & Page, and built in 1925 and 1927 by Harry Soren in a Mission/Spanish Revival style. The apartments consist of two three-story, flat-roofed, wood-framed buildings. The building at 25-31 Ontario Street was built in 1925, and forms a U-shape. 37-41 Ontario Street is to the west, is identical in detail but configured differently.

These buildings are "well-preserved examples of early twentieth-century apartment buildings and are typical of ... apartment buildings in middle-class neighborhoods during the 1910s and 1920s."  They were designed to appeal to wealthier tenants who did not want to care for single-family dwellings.  They were added to the National Register of Historic Places in 1998.

See also
National Register of Historic Places listings in Providence, Rhode Island

Notes

References
Safdie, Joshua (1997) NRHP Registration form for Ontario Apartments (PDF)

Residential buildings completed in 1924
Residential buildings on the National Register of Historic Places in Rhode Island
Buildings and structures in Providence, Rhode Island
National Register of Historic Places in Providence, Rhode Island